Brian Zabaleta (born 23 April 1998) is an Argentine professional footballer who plays as a midfielder for Gimnasia y Esgrima.

Career
Zabaleta, who also had youth stints with Empleados de Comercio and Lanús, began his senior career in Primera B Nacional with Gimnasia y Esgrima; with his breakthrough arriving in 2019. After being an unused substitute for a fixture with Defensores de Belgrano on 31 March, Zabaleta made his senior debut in a victory away to their Jujuy namesakes on 7 April; he was substituted on for Diego Auzqui with eighty minutes played.

Career statistics
.

References

External links

1998 births
Living people
Place of birth missing (living people)
Argentine footballers
Association football midfielders
Primera Nacional players
Gimnasia y Esgrima de Mendoza footballers